Doce Misiones (call sign LT 85 TV) is an Argentine television station broadcasting from Posadas, Misiones to all the province and the south of Paraguay and Brazil. It is an independent station, with a few time-delayed Artear shows. Founded on November 18, 1972, the station produces a great deal of local programming.

Local programming
The station produces around 60% of its schedule. The most important shows are:
Muy Temprano - morning newscast
El Noticiero - afternoon and evening newscast
Revista 12 - newsmagazine
Medio Tiempo Deportivo - sportscast
Caleidoscopio - children
La Tele te Llama - game show
Clase Turista - travel
De la Tribuna - sports talk
Recorriendo Alemania - travel

References

External links
Official website

Television stations in Argentina
Television channels and stations established in 1972